Măgura Ilvei is a commune in Bistrița-Năsăud County, Transylvania, Romania. It is composed of two villages, Arșița (Arsicatelep) and Măgura Ilvei. It also included Poiana Ilvei village until 2003, when it was split off.

References

Communes in Bistrița-Năsăud County
Localities in Transylvania